Pholidocarpus macrocarpus is a species of flowering plant in the family Arecaceae. It is found in Peninsular Malaysia, Sumatra, and Thailand. 
It is threatened by habitat loss.

References

macrocarpus
Trees of Thailand
Trees of Peninsular Malaysia
Trees of Sumatra
Plants described in 1886
Vulnerable plants
Taxa named by Odoardo Beccari
Taxonomy articles created by Polbot